The Deconstruction is the twelfth studio album by American rock band Eels, released on April 6, 2018. The band's twelfth studio release follows a four-year period where front man Mark Oliver "E" Everett took a hiatus from music. The album has garnered favorable reviews.

Recording
The Deconstruction is the first Eels studio album in four years; Everett was burned out after touring and recording with the band's previous releases and considered retiring from music. In the interim, he made a few public performances, acted in the Netflix original series Love, and went through a marriage, divorce, and the birth of his first son. Lyrically, the album focuses on compassion and kindness; the song "Archie Goodnight" is written for Everett's son Archie. The songs were recorded sporadically across that time and without the intent of making an album, on Everett's personal schedule.

Promotion and release
When the album was announced, the title track was made available for streaming. The band shared "Today Is the Day" on February 8, "Premonition" on March 14, and "Bone Dry" on March 28. A music video for "Bone Dry" was released the same day as the album.

Reception

The Deconstruction received generally positive reviews from music critics. At Metacritic, which assigns a normalised rating out of 100 to reviews from mainstream critics, the album has an average score of 72 based on 18 reviews, indicating "generally favorable reviews". Under the Radars Matt the Raven gave the album 5.5 out of 10, praising the album's wit and humor but decrying how long the album is, concluding that the release, "gets off to an energetic start with tracks that rock and inspire, ultimately there's too many tracks that don't rock, so it falls a bit short of what Eels are capable of". Javi Fedrick of The Arts Desk gave the album a mixed review, praising the lush instrumentation but calling it, "disjointed as a whole". In American Songwriter, Hal Horowitz gave the album 4.5 out of five stars, summing up his review, "The album is somewhat of a musical and philosophical rollercoaster. But that’s all in a day’s work for Everett who adds to his already impressive, uncompromising catalog with another expressive, rugged and diverse gem. It’s not always an easy listen but anything worthwhile generally isn’t and kudos to Everett for having the guts and musical fortitude to pull it off... as he always has." In Exclaim!, Ian Gormley gave the album a six out of 10, criticizing the lyrics and summarizing his review, "For now, The Deconstruction is a rather rote and lacklustre return". In a review giving two out of five stars, Dean Van Nguyen of The Irish Times called the album "more of the same", criticizing the release for not adding to Eels' prior albums, calling it a "typical Eels record to add to the stack." Pitchforks Ian Cohen wrote that, "Everett trots out his reflexive self-loathing and elementary rhyme schemes one more time, with no clear reason why" and peppers most of his review with sentences taken directly from previous Pitchfork reviews of Eels albums such as "it leaves little to the imagination for anyone who’s followed Eels to this point" and summarizing "The Deconstruction produces no eccentricity, pop smarts, orchestral creativity, or emotional revelation". Jamie Otsa of Drowned in Sound gave the album a seven out of 10, agreeing that the quality was uneven, calling it, "a confusing jumble of highs and lows that perhaps reflects the chaotic nature of the mind behind the record's creation" but praising the album's many tonal and mood shifts.

Track listing
"The Deconstruction" (E, Koool G Murder) – 4:10
"Bone Dry" (E, Murder) – 3:42
"The Quandary" (E) – 0:54
"Premonition" (E, Murder) – 3:12
"Rusty Pipes" (E, Murder) – 4:04
"The Epiphany" (E, Murder) – 2:18
"Today Is the Day" (E, P-Boo) – 3:03
"Sweet Scorched Earth" (E) – 3:02
"Coming Back" (E) – 0:58
"Be Hurt" (E, Murder) – 3:59
"You Are the Shining Light" (E, Murder) – 3:39
"There I Said It" (E) – 2:50
"Archie Goodnight" (E) – 0:48
"The Unanswerable" (E, Murder) – 2:08
"In Our Cathedral" (E) – 3:19

Personnel
E – guitar, vocals, production
Koool G Murder – bass guitar
P-Boo – guitar, bass guitar, keyboards, drums
with The Deconstruction Orchestra & Choir

Charts

Weekly charts

Year-end charts

References

External links

Eels and the Radical Potential of Kindness

2018 albums
Albums produced by Mark Oliver Everett
Albums produced by Mickey Petralia
Eels (band) albums
PIAS Recordings albums